Ditton may refer to:

Places

Canada
The former Ditton, Quebec, which amalgamated into La Patrie, Quebec in 1997
 Ditton River, a tributary of the rivière au Saumon in Le Haut-Saint-François Regional County Municipality, Estrie, Québec
 Ditton East River, a tributary of the Ditton River in Chartierville, Quebec
 Ditton West River, a tributary of the Ditton River in hartierville, Quebec

United Kingdom
Ditton, Halton, Cheshire
Ditton, Kent
Ditton, Slough
Ditton Green, Suffolk
Ditton Priors, Shropshire
Long Ditton, Surrey
Thames Ditton, Surrey

People with the surname
Humphry Ditton (1675–1715), English mathematician
Lia Ditton (born 1980), British sailor